A turnaround (commonly abbreviated TAR) is a scheduled event wherein an entire process unit of an industrial plant (refinery, petrochemical plant, power plant, pulp and paper mill, etc.) is taken offstream for an extended period for revamp and/or renewal. Turnaround is a blanket term that encompasses more specific terms such as I&Ts (inspection & testing), debottlenecking projects, revamps and catalyst regeneration projects. Turnaround can also be used as a synonym of shutdowns and outages.  A related term is Shutdowns, Turnarounds, and Outages sometimes written as Turnarounds, Shutdowns, and Outages (TSO).

Turnarounds are expensive - both in terms of lost production while the process unit is offline and in terms of direct costs for the labour, tools, heavy equipment and materials used to execute the project.  They are the most significant portion of a plant's yearly maintenance budget and can affect the company's bottom line if mismanaged.  Turnarounds have unique project management characteristics which make them volatile and challenging.

References

Business process management
Oil refining